Dorothy Anne Caley Klein (February 14, 1920 – September 5, 2012) was a Canadian figure skater who won the ladies title at the 1937 Canadian Figure Skating Championships.

References

Canadian female single skaters
Figure skaters from Toronto
1920 births
2012 deaths